Fairview Cemetery & Arboretum is a cemetery and accredited arboretum in Westfield, New Jersey. It is a member of the American Public Gardens Association.

The cemetery was founded in 1868 and is 105 acres. It is "non-sectarian, non-profit organization, owned and operated solely for the benefit of its Property Owners."

Notable burials
 Virginia Apgar (1909–1974), pioneer of neonatology and the Apgar score
 Bobbi Kristina Brown (1993–2015), singer and TV star
 Joe Collins (1922–1989), baseball player
 Charles N. Fowler (1922–1989), US Congressman
 Whitney Houston (1963–2012), singer
 Claydes Charles Smith (1948–2006), co-founder of Kool & the Gang
 William Miller Sperry (1858–1927), namesake of the William Miller Sperry Observatory and brother of Thomas Sperry.

References

External links
 
 

1868 establishments in New Jersey
Cemeteries in Union County, New Jersey
Westfield, New Jersey